

Volumes

See also
Columbia University Indo-Iranian Series

References

Series of books
Columbia University Press books
Biology books